Shure is an English surname. It is the surname of:
Aaron Shure, American television writer and producer
Brian Shure (born 1952), American printmaker and painter
Leonard Shure (1910–1995), American concert pianist
Michael Shure (born 1966), American television host and political commentator
Patricia D. Shure, American mathematics educator
Sidney N. Shure, founder of the Shure audio electronics corporation